Choi Min-ho is a South Korean judoka. He was born on August 18, 1980 in Gimcheon, Gyeongsangbuk-do, South Korea.

Career 
He competed in the 2004 Summer Olympics where he won the bronze medal and defeated then world champion Craig Fallon. He also competed in the 2008 Summer Olympics, where he won the gold medal in the 60 kg extra-lightweight category. In Beijing, he ended all 5 of his matches by Ippon and defeated former European champion Ludwig Paischer in the final for the gold medal.

Choi was voted as the 2008 Best Judoka of the Year by L´Esprit du Judo magazine of France.

References

External links
 
 Videos of Choi Min-ho (judovision.org)
 

1980 births
Living people
South Korean Roman Catholics
Judoka at the 2004 Summer Olympics
Judoka at the 2008 Summer Olympics
Olympic judoka of South Korea
Olympic gold medalists for South Korea
Olympic bronze medalists for South Korea
Olympic medalists in judo
Asian Games medalists in judo
World judo champions
Medalists at the 2008 Summer Olympics
Medalists at the 2004 Summer Olympics
Judoka at the 2002 Asian Games
Judoka at the 2010 Asian Games
South Korean male judoka
Asian Games bronze medalists for South Korea
Medalists at the 2002 Asian Games
Medalists at the 2010 Asian Games
Universiade medalists in judo
Universiade bronze medalists for South Korea
People from Gimcheon
21st-century South Korean people